The western vlei rat (Otomys occidentalis) is a species of rodent in the family Muridae.
It is found in Cameroon and Nigeria.
Its natural habitats are subtropical or tropical high-altitude grassland and swamps.
It is threatened by habitat loss.

References

Otomys
Mammals described in 1992
Taxonomy articles created by Polbot
Fauna of the Cameroonian Highlands forests